Retirement, Survivors, Disability Insurance (RSDI) or  Title II system  was part of Franklin D. Roosevelt's New Deal during the Great Depression.

The insurance took to the form of social security payments for widows with a family to support, the handicapped and others in need of money who were not able to support themselves.  It was enacted in 1935. 

The term is sometimes used interchangeably with Old-Age, Survivors, and Disability Insurance (OASDI), another name for Social Security (United States).

References

New Deal